The 2003 Cyprus Rally (formally the 31st Cyprus Rally) was the seventh round of the 2003 World Rally Championship. The race was held over three days between 20 June and 22 June 2003, and was based in Limassol, Cyprus. Subaru's Petter Solberg won the race, his 2nd win in the World Rally Championship.

Background

Entry list

Itinerary
All dates and times are EEST (UTC+3).

Results

Overall

World Rally Cars

Classification

Special stages

Championship standings

Production World Rally Championship

Classification

Special stages

Championship standings

References

External links 
 Official website of the World Rally Championship

Cyprus
Cyprus Rally
2003 in Cypriot sport